is a Japanese football player. She plays for Urawa Reds in the WE League. She played for Japan national team.

Club career
Shibata was born in Kitakyushu on July 27, 1992. After graduating from high school, she joined Urawa Reds in 2011. She was selected Best Eleven in 2015 season.

National team career
In August 2012, Shibata was selected Japan U-20 national team for 2012 U-20 World Cup. She played 6 games and scored 3 goals, and Japan won 3rd place. Shibata was named the 2012 Asian Young Footballer of the Year. In August 2015, she was selected Japan national team for 2015 East Asian Cup. At this competition, on August 4, she debuted against South Korea.

National team statistics

References

External links

Japan Football Association

1992 births
Living people
Association football people from Fukuoka Prefecture
Japanese women's footballers
Japan women's international footballers
Nadeshiko League players
Urawa Red Diamonds Ladies players
Asian Young Footballer of the Year winners
Women's association football midfielders